Mirsad Cehaic (born June 15, 1951) is a Croatian former footballer who played in the National Soccer League, and North American Soccer League.

Club career 
Cehaic played with Toronto Croatia in the National Soccer League in 1974. In 1975, he signed with Toronto Metros-Croatia in the North American Soccer League, where he appeared in nine matches.

References 

1951 births
Living people
Association football defenders
Yugoslav footballers
Toronto Croatia players
Toronto Blizzard (1971–1984) players
Canadian National Soccer League players
North American Soccer League (1968–1984) players
Yugoslav expatriate footballers
Expatriate soccer players in Canada
Yugoslav expatriate sportspeople in Canada